Francis Ndjali Mustafa (born 3 May 1996) is a Burundian football player. He plays in Rwanda for Bugesera. His last name is spelled Moustapha in some sources.

International
He made his Burundi national football team debut on 17 October 2015 in a 2016 African Nations Championship qualification game against Ethiopia.

He was selected for the 2019 Africa Cup of Nations squad.

References

External links
 
 

1996 births
Living people
Burundian footballers
Burundi international footballers
Association football midfielders
Muzinga FC players
S.C. Kiyovu Sports players
Gor Mahia F.C. players
Bugesera FC players
Kenyan Premier League players
Burundian expatriate footballers
Expatriate footballers in Rwanda
Burundian expatriate sportspeople in Rwanda
Expatriate footballers in Kenya
Burundian expatriate sportspeople in Kenya

2019 Africa Cup of Nations players
21st-century Burundian people